Calucci's Department is an American television sitcom broadcast by CBS. It premiered on September 14, 1973, and after failing to compete in the ratings against NBC's Sanford and Son, was canceled after the December 28 episode. It was replaced on January 11, 1974 by the 13-week Dirty Sally, a half-hour western starring Jeanette Nolan and Dack Rambo.

The series focused on Joe Calucci, the supervisor of a New York City unemployment office. His day was spent dealing with a disparate group of claimants, the petty squabbles among the members of his staff (represented by a cross-section of ethnic backgrounds), the frustrations of governmental red tape and his infatuation with his secretary Shirley. Except for its setting, the show was similar to the British hit Are You Being Served?, which had premiered in 1972.

Principal cast
James Coco as Joe Calucci
Candy Azzara as Shirley Balukis
Rosetta LeNoire as Mitzi Gordon
Peggy Pope as Elanie Fusco
Bill Lazarus as Jack Woods
Jack Fletcher as Oscar Cosgrove
Jose Perez as Ramon Gonzalez

Episodes

References
The Complete Directory to Prime Time Network Shows 1946 - Present by Tim Brooks and Earle Marsh, Ballantine Books, pp. 124–125

External links
 

1970s American sitcoms
1970s American workplace comedy television series
1973 American television series debuts
1973 American television series endings
CBS original programming
English-language television shows
Television shows filmed in New York (state)
Television shows set in New York City